Darlington is the parliamentary constituency for the eponymous market town in County Durham in the North East of England. It is currently represented in the House of Commons of the UK Parliament by Peter Gibson of the Conservative Party, who was first elected in 2019.

The constituency was created for the 1868 election; it covers the market town of Darlington in County Durham.

Constituency profile
The constituency is tightly drawn around the Darlington urban boundary, and is slightly less wealthy and more deprived than the UK average figures.

Boundaries

1868–1885 
Under the Reform Act 1867, the proposed contents of the new parliamentary borough were defined as the townships of Darlington, Haughton-le-Skerne, and Cockerton. However, this was amended under the Boundary Act 1868, with the boundary defined as being coterminous with the Municipal Borough of Darlington.

See map on Vision of Britain website.

1885-1918 
As defined in 1868 with minor amendments.

1918–1983 
The County Borough of Darlington.

The boundaries were adjusted in 1918, 1950 and 1973 to reflect changes to the boundaries of the county borough.

1983–2010 
The Borough of Darlington wards of Bank Top, Central, Cockerton East, Cockerton West, college, Eastbourne North, Eastbourne South, Harrowgate Hill, Haughton East, Haughton West, Hummersknott, Lascelles, Lingfield, Mowden, Northgate North, Northgate South, North Road, Park East, Park West, and Pierremont.

No change to boundaries.

2010–2015 

The Borough of Darlington wards of Bank Top, Central, Cockerton East, Cockerton West, College, Eastbourne, Faverdale, Harrowgate Hill, Haughton East, Haughton North, Haughton West, Hummersknott, Lascelles, Lingfield, Mowden, Northgate, North Road, Park East, Park West, and Pierremont.

Minor change to reflect new ward boundaries.

2015–present 
The Borough of Darlington wards of Bank Top and Lascelles, Brinkburn and Faverdale, Cockerton, College, Eastbourne, Harrowgate Hill, Haughton and Springfield, Hummersknott, Mowden, Northgate, North Road, Park East, Park West, Pierremont, Red Hall and Lingfield, Stephenson, and Whinfield.

Following a further change to the ward boundaries of Darlington Borough in 2015, the contents of the seat are currently as above. No change to boundaries.

Political history 
The seat has been held by all three major parties in its long existence, but has been a marginal constituency between the Labour and Conservative parties in the years since the Second World War. Labour held the seat for 27 years from 1992 with their candidate Jenny Chapman winning the seat in 2010 with a 3,388 majority down from 10,404 in the previous election. In 2015, her majority over the Conservatives fell to 3,158. In the UK General election 2019 Conservative Peter Gibson defeated Chapman with a 3,294 majority.

Members of Parliament

Elections

Elections in the 2010s 

In the 2015 election, 89 ballot papers were issued omitting the UKIP candidate before the error was corrected.

Elections in the 2000s

Elections in the 1990s

Elections in the 1980s

Elections in the 1970s

Elections in the 1960s

Elections in the 1950s

Election in the 1940s

Elections in the 1930s

Elections in the 1920s

Election results 1868–1918

Elections in the 1860s

Elections in the 1870s

Elections in the 1880s

Elections in the 1890s 

Pease's death causes a by-election.

Elections in the 1900s

Elections in the 1910s 

General Election 1914–15:

Another General Election was required to take place before the end of 1915. The political parties had been making preparations for an election to take place and by the July 1914, the following candidates had been selected; 
Unionist: Herbert Pease
Liberal: Alfred Scott
Labour: T. Russell Williams

See also 
 List of parliamentary constituencies in County Durham
 History of parliamentary constituencies and boundaries in Durham
 1923 Darlington by-election
 1926 Darlington by-election
 1983 Darlington by-election

Notes

References

Parliamentary constituencies in North East England
Constituencies of the Parliament of the United Kingdom established in 1868
Politics of Darlington
Parliamentary constituencies in County Durham